The Sukhoi Su-9 (NATO reporting name: Fishpot) was a single-engine, all-weather, missile-armed interceptor aircraft developed by the Soviet Union.

Development

The Su-9 emerged from aerodynamic studies by TsAGI, the Soviet aerodynamic center, during the Korean War, which devised several optimum aerodynamic configurations for jet fighters. The design first flew in 1956 as the T-405 prototype. The Su-9 was developed at the same time as the Su-7 "Fitter", and the West first saw both at the Tushino Aviation Day on June 24, 1956, where the Su-9 was dubbed Fitter-B. It entered service in 1959.

The total production of the Su-9 was about 1,100 aircraft. It is believed that at least some Su-9s were upgraded to Su-11 "Fishpot-C" form. None were exported to any of the USSR's client states nor to the Warsaw Pact nations. The remaining Su-9s and later Su-11s were retired during the 1970s. Some were retained as test vehicles or converted to remote-piloted vehicles for use as unmanned aerial vehicles. It was replaced by the upgraded Su-11 and the much-superior Su-15 "Flagon" and MiG-25 "Foxbat".

The combat record of the "Fishpot" is poorly documented. It is possible that it was involved in the interception (or even shoot-down) of reconnaissance missions, but no information has been publicly declassified.

Being an interceptor, the Su-9 was used in routine patrols and interdictions over the Soviet Frontiers. The most widely known involved in the interception of Francis Gary Powers' U-2 on Soviet territory on May 1, 1960. The Su-9 was unarmed and was directed to ram the U-2. One ramming attempt was made, but the Su-9 missed the U-2 due to the significant difference in the speed of the two planes. Due to the Su-9's lack of fuel, the pilot elected to break away from the U2 and continue with the original flight plan.
Its pilot, Captain Igor Mentyukov, later claimed that his slipstream caused the U-2 to break apart. He discounts the official version that the U-2 was shot down by an SA-2 missile, explaining that Cpt. Powers could not have survived such a hit.

On September 4, 1959 a modified Su-9 (designated T-431 by the bureau) piloted by Vladimir Sergeievitch Ilyushin set a new world record for absolute height, at 28,852 m (94,658 ft). In November of the same year, Ilyushin set several new sustained speed/altitude records in the same aircraft. This record was later broken on December 6, 1959, by Commander Lawrence E. Flint Jr., who performed a zoom climb to a world record of 98,557  feet (30,040 meters) while piloting an F4H-1 Phantom.

Design

The Su-9's fuselage and tail surfaces resembled those of the Su-7, but unlike the swept wing of that aircraft, the "Fishpot" used a 53° delta wing with conventional slab tailplanes. It shared Sukhoi features like the rear-fuselage air brakes as well as the Su-7's Lyulka AL-7 turbojet engine and nose intake. The translating shock cone contains the radar set.

The Su-9 was developed from earlier work on a developmental aircraft designated T-3, to which the Su-9 was nearly identical. Internally at Sukhoi, the Su-9 was known as the T-43.

The delta wing of the Su-9 was adopted because of its lower drag in the supersonic flight regime. Its greater volume also allowed a modest fuel capacity increase compared to the Su-7. The Su-9 was capable of Mach 1.8 at altitude or about Mach 1.14 with missiles. However, its fuel fraction remained minimal, and its operational radius was limited. Furthermore, rotation speeds were even higher than the Su-7, which was already high at 360  km/h (225  mph). Unlike the Su-7, which had cumbersome controls but docile handling characteristics, the "Fishpot" had light and responsive controls but was unforgiving of pilot error.

The Su-9 had primitive R1L (NATO reporting name "High Fix") radar in the shock cone and was armed with four K-5 (AA-1 "Alkali") beam-riding air-to-air missiles. Like all beam-riders, the K-5 was so limited as to be nearly useless for air-to-air combat . Unlike the Su-7 and later Su-15, no Su-9 carried cannon armament, although two fuselage pylons were reserved for the carriage of drop tanks.

A two-seat trainer version designated Su-9U was also produced in limited numbers (about 50 aircraft). It received the NATO reporting name "Maiden." It had a full armament and radar system with displays in both cockpits, allowing trainees to practice all aspects of the interception mission. Still, because the second seat further reduced the already meager fuel fraction, it was not genuinely combat-capable.

The Su-9 has been frequently mistaken for the MiG-21 due to the many similarities in design. The primary distinguishing factors are size and the Su-9's bubble canopy.

Variants
Development of the Su-9.
T-405
Prototype model of the Su-9.
Su-9
Production variant, about 1,100 built.
Su-9U
Training variant, mounting the standard avionics suite without weapon systems or hardpoints. About 50 units were manufactured.
T-431
A specially modified Su-9 for setting the world record for absolute height in 1962.
Sukhoi Su-11
A upgraded design based on the Su-9. It was slightly lengthened compared to the Su-9. However, it was outmoded by the Sukhoi Su-15, which offered vastly increased range and aerodynamic performance.
Sukhoi Su-17
Is the first Sukhoi design to incorporate a Variable-sweep wing. The Su-17 was designed in parallel with the Su-11 but was delayed until the wing-sweeping mechanism was ready. The Su-17 exists in numerous variations and was exported to Warsaw Pact nations and other nations such as Peru (See: Peruvian Air Force).

Operators

Soviet Anti-Air Defense
894th Fighter Aviation Regiment, Ozernoye, Ukraine, 1959-1979.

Specifications (Su-9)

See also

References

External links

Su-9 from NAPO (Novosibirsk Aircraft Production Association)
 Su-9 from Global Aircraft
 Su-9 from FAS

Su-09
1950s Soviet fighter aircraft
Single-engined jet aircraft
Delta-wing aircraft
Aircraft first flown in 1956